Indian War may refer to:
 American Indian Wars, name generally used in the United States to describe conflicts between the colonial or federal government and the native people of North America.
 Mexican Indian Wars, name generally used to describe conflicts between the Spanish, or Mexican, colonial or federal government, and the native people of North America.
 Military history of India/List of wars involving India, war history of India
 Kurukshetra War, war mentioned in the Indian epic Mahabharata
 Iranian invasion of India or Achaemenid conquest of the Indus Valley
 Greek campaigns in India
 Indian campaign of Alexander the Great
 Shaka invasion of India
 Muslim conquests in the Indian subcontinent
 Umayyad campaigns in India
 Chola expedition to North India
 Mongol invasions of India
 Mongol invasion of India (1297–1298)
 Mongol invasion of India (1303)
 Mongol invasion of India (1306)
 Babur's First Indian Expedition
 List of Anglo-Indian Wars
 War of the League of the Indies
 Nader Shah's invasion of India
 Maratha conquest of North-west India
 Indian campaign of Ahmad Shah Durrani
 East Indies campaign (disambiguation)
 British conquest of India or Company rule in India, administrative takeover of India by the British East India Company
 Indian War of Independence or Indian Rebellion of 1857, revolt in India against British rule
 India in World War I
 Afghan invasion of British India or Third Anglo-Afghan War
 India in World War II
 Indian Independence movement
 Revolutionary movement for Indian independence
 Communist involvement in Indian Independence movement
 Indo-Pakistani wars and conflicts
 Sino-Indian War
 Indian intervention in the Sri Lankan Civil War
 2001 Bangladesh–India border clashes
 India-Pakistan border skirmishes (disambiguation)
 Sino-Indian skirmish (disambiguation)
 Separatist movements of India

See also
 Hindu mythological wars
 Mughal war of succession (disambiguation)